"The Dark Side" is a song by British rock band Muse. It was released as a single on 30 August 2018 as the fourth single from Simulation Theory, their eighth studio album.

Release
The name of the fourth single to be released ahead of Muse's then-unnamed eighth studio album was first teased in the music video for previous single "Something Human", which was released on 19 July 2018. In the music video for "Something Human", lead singer Matt Bellamy can be seen driving a Lamborghini Countach which featured the vehicle registration plate "DRKSIDE". Subsequently, on 30 August 2018, the name of the upcoming album was revealed to be Simulation Theory and its release date was confirmed; later that day, Muse released "The Dark Side" as the surprise next single from the album.

Writing and composition
"The Dark Side" has been described as a rock opera with features from electropop and rock.

Music video
The music video for "The Dark Side", released on the same day as the single, continues the running theme of the previous music videos from Simulation Theory, picking up where the music video for previous single "Something Human" ends.

In the video, Bellamy is seen driving a Lamborghini Countach supercar through the dystopian cyberpunk landscape which first appeared at the end of the "Something Human" music video, after he crashed through a wormhole in a collision with a police car which had been pursuing him. This dystopian world, one of many simulated realities featured in Simulation Theory music videos, is populated by giant robots attempting to kill or capture Bellamy as he attempts to understand or overcome the simulations; these robots are later revealed to be Murph, the giant robot which appeared above the stage during the finale of Simulation Theory World Tour concerts. Bellamy swerves the car to avoid the robots as they break through the ground in an attempt to reach him, before driving into the mouth of one of them and observing its brain. He then escapes the robot, ramming the car through the back of its skull, and landing on a bridge which passes many deactivated robots on his way to a futuristic neon city; he reaches the safety of the city just as the robots begin to wake up and destroy the bridge behind him.

Personnel
Credits adapted from Tidal.

Muse
Matt Bellamy – lead vocals, guitars, keyboards, production, composition, songwriting
Chris Wolstenholme – bass, backing vocals, production
Dominic Howard – drums, production

Production
Rich Costey – production
Adam Hawkins – engineering
Aleks Von Korff – assistant engineering
Rob Bisel – assistant engineering
Tyler Beans – assistant engineering
Spike Stent – mixing
Michael Freeman – mixing
Pete Winfield – mixing

Charts

References 

2018 singles
2018 songs
Muse (band) songs
Songs written by Matt Bellamy